Cut Teeth are an American rock band from Chicago, Illinois.

History
Cut Teeth began in 2012, releasing their first EP titled Televandalism via Topshelf Records.

In October 2014, Cut Teeth released their first full-length album, Night Years, via Topshelf Records.

Band members
Dustin Currier (vocals, guitar)
Dan Yingling (guitar)
Kyle Johns (bass, backing vocals)
Matt Jordan (drums)

Discography
Studio albums
Night Years (2014, Topshelf)
EPs
Televandalism (2012, Topshelf)

References

Musical groups from Chicago
Musical groups established in 2012
Topshelf Records artists
2012 establishments in Illinois